Beant Singh (19 February 1922 – 31 August 1995) was an Indian politician and the Chief Minister of Punjab from 1992 to 1995. He was a member of Indian National Congress. He was assassinated in a suicide bombing.

Early life 
Beant was born in Jhajj Jatt Sikh Family from Bilaspur village near Doraha in Ludhiana District. The family migrated to Canal colonies of the West Punjab but shifted to village Kotli (Kotla Afghana) near Payal in the Ludhiana district after partition. He completed his education from the Government College Lahore. At the age of 23, he joined the army but after two years of service, decided to make a switch to politics and social work.

Political career 

After the 1947 partition, Beant Singh entered the Punjab politics. In 1960 he was elected chairman of block samiti (committee) of Doraha, in Ludhiana district. After serving for some time as Director of the Central cooperative bank in Ludhiana, Beant Singh entered the Punjab Vidhan Sabha (assembly) as an independent candidate in 1969.

Assassination 

Beant Singh was assassinated in a bomb blast at the secretariat complex in Chandigarh on 31 August 1995. The blast claimed the lives of 17 others including 3 Indian commandos. Beant Singh was accompanied by his close friend Ranjodh Singh Mann on the day of assassination. Dilawar Singh Babbar of Babbar Khalsa International acted as the suicide bomber; later, the backup bomber Balwant Singh Rajoana was also convicted of the killing.

In 2012, a Chandigarh court sentenced Rajoana to death. A number of Sikhs protested against the decision, and campaigned to stop the execution of Balwant Singh Rajoana. On 28 March 2012 the Government Of India stayed the execution of Rajoana after Punjab Chief Minister Parkash Singh Badal met President Pratibha Patil seeking clemency for him.

On 7 January 2015, Jagtar Singh alias Tara who is alleged to be the mastermind in assassination of Singh was arrested by Thai Police in Bangkok after a request by the Indian investigative agency (Central Bureau of Investigation). Tara is currently undergoing a trial in an Indian prison.

Personal life 

His son Tej Parkash Singh was minister in the Punjab government led by Harcharan Singh Brar who succeeded him. His daughter Gurkanwal Kaur is a former minister of state for social welfare and Parliamentary secretary in the Amarinder Singh government. His grandson Ravneet Singh is an MP from Ludhiana. Another grandson, Gurkirat Singh Kotli, is an MLA from Khanna. Another grandson Guriqbal Singh is DSP Punjab Police. His wife died in 2010.

References

Bibliography

(1995). "Beant Singh." The Times. 4 September.
Burns, John (1995). "New Violence in India." The New York Times. 1 September.
Dahlberg, John-Thor (1995). "Punjabi Minister Killed by Car Bomb in India." Los Angeles Times. 1 September.
Tully, Mark (1995). "Beant Singh; Claws of the Lion." The Guardian. 4 September.

1995 deaths
1922 births
Chief ministers from Indian National Congress
People from Punjab, India
Chief Ministers of Punjab, India
Assassinated Indian politicians
People murdered in Chandigarh
Punjabi people
Punjab, India MLAs 1992–1997
Terrorism victims in India
Victims of Sikh terrorism
Suicide bombing in the Punjab insurgency
Deaths by car bomb in India
Indian National Congress politicians from Punjab, India